Acalyptris lundiensis is a moth in the family Nepticulidae. It was described by Scoble in 1980. It is known from Zimbabwe.

References

Endemic fauna of Zimbabwe
Moths of Africa
Nepticulidae
Moths described in 1980